Siri Joy Freeh (born September 11, 1989) is an American radio host and former beauty pageant titleholder from Lake Park, Minnesota who was named Miss Minnesota 2012.

Biography
Winning the title of Miss Minnesota on June 16, 2012, Siri received her crown from outgoing titleholder Natalie Davis. Freeh's platform is heart-health education, and her competition talent was dance. Freeh is a senior in the University Honors Program at the University of Minnesota, majoring in nursing. She intends to earn a doctorate degree and specialize in cardiovascular research. She recently became a radio personality on Twin Cities News Talk, AM 1130 and hosts her on radio show, Saturdays with Siri. It is aired every Saturday from 12-2pm on Twin Cities News Talk, AM 1130.

References

External links

 

Miss America 2013 delegates
1989 births
Living people
People from Lake Park, Minnesota
University of Minnesota School of Nursing alumni
American beauty pageant winners